Lisa Eyamie (born April 10, 1977 in Winnipeg, Manitoba as Lisa Fargey) is a Canadian curler from Calgary, Alberta.

Career
Eyamie was a top junior curler in her native province of Manitoba. She played in six provincial junior championships and in five provincial mixed championships. In addition to that, Eyamie has curled in 4 Manitoba Scotties Tournament of Hearts and 3 Alberta Scotties Tournament of Hearts winning the 2017 Alberta Scotties Tournament of Hearts.

Eyamie left Manitoba in 2008 to play third for Heather Rankin's Calgary rink. The team qualified for the 2009 Olympic Pre-Trials finishing with a 1-3 record.

Eyamie left the Rankin rink in 2010 to skip her own team.
In 2016 Eyamie joined Shannon Kliebrink's team
In 2017 they won the 2017 Alberta Scotties Tournament of Hearts and went on to represent Alberta at the 2017 Scotties Tournament of Hearts. They finished 5-6.

Personal life
Eyamie is a graduate of the University of Manitoba. She works as a director for Long View Systems. She is married and has two children.

References

External links
 

1977 births
Living people
Canadian women curlers
Curlers from Calgary
Curlers from Winnipeg
21st-century Canadian women